Sheybani (also Romanized as Sheybānī; also known as Kalāteh-ye Sheybānī) is a village in Ali Jamal Rural District, in the Central District of Boshruyeh County, South Khorasan Province, Iran. At the 2006 census, its population was 29, in 11 families.

References 

Populated places in Boshruyeh County